Michel Sardaby (born 4 September 1935)  is a French jazz pianist.

Background and career
Born in Fort-de-France, Martinique, he moved to Paris, where in March 1967, he was one of the pianists, the others being Joe "Stride" Turner, Errol Parker, Claude Bolling, Stuart de Silva, and Aaron Bridgers, accompanied on some tracks by bassist John Lamb, among others, who recorded the 90-minute session known as Tape for Billy, dedicated to Billy Strayhorn, who was in hospital. Duke Ellington, also in Paris, personally supervised the recording, although he did not actually perform on it himself, and wanted to use the proceeds from its sale to create a Billy Strayhorn scholarship in Paris, similar to the one at Juilliard in New York.

Sardaby's first album Five Cat`s Blues was recorded in October 1967 in Paris with 5 compositions created by the pianist. In 1970, he led a trio comprising Percy Heath and Connie Kay for his second album, Night Cap. A 1972 New York recording has him leading a line-up comprising Richard Davis, Billy Cobham and Ray Barretto (Sound Hills Records 1997). His album, Gail (1974), won the 1976 Prix Boris Vian.

For his 1989 album, Going Places, he was accompanied by Rufus Reid and Marvin "Smitty" Smith, and in 1993, he recorded with his quintet, which comprised Ralph Moore, Louis Smith, Peter Washington and Tony Reedus.

Discography
As leader/co-leader
1969  Five Cat`s Blues (President)
1970: Night Cap (Sound Hills)
1970: Blue Sunset
1972: Michel Sardaby in New York (Sound Hills)
1975: Gail (Disques Debs)
1990: Going Places (Mantra)
1990: Night Blossom (DIW Records)
1990: In New York (Disques Debs)
1990: Con Alma (Mantra)
1993: Straight On (Sound Hills)
1997: Classics and Ballads (Sound Hills)
1997: Intense Moment (Sound Hills)
2003: Karen (Sound Hills)
2004  At Home (Sound Hills)
2014: Night in Paris (Sound Hills)

With T-Bone Walker
Good Feelin' (Polydor, 1969)

References

1935 births
Living people
People from Fort-de-France
Martiniquais musicians
French jazz pianists
French male pianists
21st-century pianists
21st-century French male musicians
French male jazz musicians